Cândido Maia (born 8 February 1969) is a retired Portuguese athlete who specialised in the middle-distance events. He represented his country at three World Indoor Championships.

Competition record

Personal bests
Outdoor
1500 metres – 3:45.90 (Lisbon 1998)
5000 metres – 13:43.22 (Pontevedra 1993)
3000 metres steeplechase – 8:35.62 (Maia 1996)
10 kilometres – 30:33 (Amora 2001)

Indoor
1500 metres – 3:46.69 (Paris 1994)
3000 metres – 7:53.58 (Genoa 1992)

References

All-Athletics profile

1969 births
Living people
Portuguese male middle-distance runners
Portuguese male steeplechase runners